Usilla (gastropod) is a genus of sea snails, marine gastropod mollusks, in the subfamily Ergalataxinae of the family Muricidae.

Species
Species within the genus Usilla include:
 Usilla avenacea (Lesson, 1842)
 Usilla tosana (Pilsbry, 1904)

References

External links
  Adams, H. (1861). On two new genera of acephalous molluscs. Proceedings of the Zoological Society of London. (1860) 28: 369.

 
Gastropods described in 1861